One of the most common locations for a foreign body is the alimentary tract. It is possible for foreign bodies to enter the from the mouth, or from the rectum.

The objects most commonly swallowed by children are coins. Meat impaction, resulting in esophageal food bolus obstruction is more common in adults. Swallowed objects are more likely to lodge in the esophagus or stomach than in the pharynx or duodenum.

Diagnosis
If the person who swallowed the foreign body is doing well, usually an x-ray image will be taken which will show any metal objects, and this will be repeated a few days later to confirm that the object has passed all the way through the digestive system. Also it needs to be confirmed that the object is not stuck in the airways, in the bronchial tree.

Treatment
Most objects that are swallowed will, if they have passed the pharynx, pass all the way through the gastrointestinal tract unaided. However, sometimes an object becomes arrested (usually in the terminal ileum or the rectum) or a sharp object penetrates the bowel wall. If the foreign body causes problems like pain, vomiting or bleeding it must be removed.

Swallowed batteries can be associated with additional damage, with mercury poisoning (from mercury batteries) and lead poisoning (from lead batteries) presenting important risks.

While swallowed coins typically traverse the alimentary tract without further incident, care must be taken to monitor patients, as reaction of the metals in the coin with gastric acid and other digestive juices may produce various toxic compounds if the coin remains within the alimentary tract for a prolonged period of time.

Endoscopic foreign body retrieval is the first-line treatment for removal of a foreign body from the alimentary tract.

Glucagon has been used to treat esophageal foreign bodies, with the intent that it relaxes the smooth muscle of the lower esophageal spincter to allow the foreign body to pass into the stomach. However, evidence does not support a benefit of treatment with glucagon, and its use may result in side effects.

Objective testing of passing small objects

In 2018, an international team of six paediatric health-care professionals undertook a self-administered test, by swallowing a Lego piece (specifically, a Lego minifigure head) and checking when the pieces appeared. They developed a Stool Hardness and Transit (SHAT) score to normalise stool consistency over time, and resulted in a Found and Retrieved Time (FART) score.  The principal finding of this study, the FART score (n = 5), ranged from 1.14 days (27 h 20 min) to 3.04 days (72 h 35 min), with an average retrieval time of 1.71 days. Their conclusion: "This international, multicentre trial identified that small objects, such as those swallowed by children, are likely to pass in 1–3 days without complication. This should offer reassurance for parents."

See also
 101 Things Removed from the Human Body, 2003 British documentary detailing unusual foreign objects located and removed from patients
 Bezoar
 Rectal foreign body

References

External links 

Pediatrics
Gastrointestinal tract disorders
Alimentary tract